Iulija Vladislavivna Osmak is a Ukrainian chess player who holds the title of Woman grandmaster (WGM, 2016) and International master (IM, 2017). Women's Chess Olympiad winner (2022).

Biography 
Osmak won the Ukrainian Girl's Chess Championships several times in different age categories: U10 (2006, 2008), U12 (2010), U16 (2013), U20 (2012, 2013). In 2010, she won the World Youth Chess Championship in the U12 girl's age group. She won bronze medals at the European Youth Chess Championships twice: in the U10 girl's age category (2008) and in the U12 girl's age category (2010). At the Ukrainian Women's Chess Championships Osmak won gold (2017), silver (2019) and four bronze (2014, 2015, 2018, 2020) medals.

In August 2021, in Iași Osmak won 2nd place in the European Individual Women's Chess Championship. In November 2021, in Riga she ranked 21st in FIDE Women's Grand Swiss Tournament 2021.

Osmak represented the Ukrainian team in major team chess tournaments:
 participated in Women's Chess Olympiad 2 times (2018, 2022) and won in the team competition gold (2022) and silver (2018) medals;
 participated in European Women's Team Chess Championship 3 times (2017, 2019, 2021). won a bronze (2017) medal in the team competition;
 participated in World Women's Team Chess Championship 2 times (2017, 2021).

Osmaka was awarded the title of International Grandmaster (WGM) in 2016 by FIDE, and in 2017 the title of International Master (IM).

Disqualification from the FIDE Universiade tournament 
On 27 and 28 March 2021, Iulija Osmak won with a score of 4.5/5 in the final of the Women's Rapid section of the 1st FIDE World University Online Chess Championship, but her score was changed to 0/5, with Julia Antolak declared the winner. She was disqualified based on a statistical analysis of her five games from the final. The Fair Play Panel of the event say 20 players in total were disqualified but that they are not claiming "proof of actual cheating". Osmak has expressed a willingness to take a lie-detector test to dispute that verdict.

References

External links 
 
 
 FIDE World University Championship Participants Disqualified Without 'Proof Of Actual Cheating', from Chess.com

Living people
Ukrainian female chess players
Chess woman grandmasters
Chess International Masters
World Youth Chess Champions
Sportspeople from Kyiv
1998 births